Krzysztof Andrzej Strugarek (born 19 July 1987 in Poznań, Poland) is a Polish retired footballer who played as a defender. Strugarek competed in the 2007 FIFA U-20 World Cup in Canada.

Born with a hearing impediment, he retired in 2010 in order to undergo a hearing implant surgery; the device would make it impossible for him to head a football.

References

1987 births
Living people
Polish footballers
Poland youth international footballers
Lech Poznań players
Wisła Płock players
Warta Poznań players
Polonia Bytom players
Ekstraklasa players
I liga players
II liga players
Footballers from Poznań
Association football defenders